"Wo ein Mensch Vertrauen gibt" (Where a person gives trust) is a Christian hymn with text by , written in 1974, with a melody by Winfried Heurich and Fritz Baltruweit. The song of the genre Neues Geistliches Lied was included in hymnals and songbooks.

History 
The song has short stanzas of four lines each, all giving a condition, ending in the same two lines "fällt ein Tropfen von dem Regen / der aus Wüsten Gärten macht" (then a drop falls of the rain that turns deserts to gardens).

The song of the genre Neues Geistliches Lied was included in the German Catholic hymnal Gotteslob in 2013, in the Diocese of Limburg as GL 839. It became EG 638 in the Protestant hymnal Evangelisches Gesangbuch. It was also added to other songbooks including Junges Gotteslob, the hymnal for young people, and other collections for young people.

References 

Catholic hymns in German
Contemporary Christian songs
1974 songs
Neues Geistliches Lied